Bells Crossroad is an unincorporated community in Spotsylvania County, in the U.S. state of Virginia.  This community is centered on the intersection of Stubbs Bridge Road (Route 612) and Lawyer's Road (Route 601).

Nearby Churches
Branch Fork Baptist Church, 6930 Stubbs Bridge Rd
Olivet United Methodist Church, 7676 Stubbs Bridge Rd

Nearby communities and landmarks
Paytes, Virginia: Marked at the intersections of Lawyers Road (Route 601) and West Catharpin Road (Route 608), and extends east to the fork of West Catharpin Road and Post Oak Road (Route 606).
Granite Springs, Virginia, further north, at the intersection of Belmont Road (Route 652), Lawyers Road (Route 601), and Granite Springs Road (Route 664).  This community extends north along Lawyers Road and Granite Springs Road (Route 680), until they reconverge.  Plentiful Creek, which forms its southern and eastern boundary, flows through the Belmont area on its way to Lake Anna.
Belmont, Spotsylvania County, Virginia, to the west on Jones Powell Road (Route 653), where it intersects Belmont Road (Route 652).
Bells Crossroads, in nearby Louisa County, Virginia.
Orange Springs, a historic home, farm complex, and former resort spa in nearby Orange County, Virginia, is accessible via Orange Springs Road (Route 653), after heading west on Jones Powell Road (Route 653), and then north on Belmont Road (Route 652) from Bells Crossroad.  Heading west on Route 653 from Belmont, it becomes Route 629 at Danton (intersection with Route 651) and the farm entrance is located on Route 629 before it intersects with US 522.  Orange Springs was visited by President James Madison and is on the National Register of Historic Places.
Lake Anna State Park, located off of Lawyers Road, to the south.

References

Unincorporated communities in Virginia
Unincorporated communities in Spotsylvania County, Virginia